Tibet in Song is a 2009 documentary film written, produced, and directed by Ngawang Choephel. The film celebrates traditional Tibetan folk music while depicting the past fifty years of Chinese rule in Tibet, including Ngawang's experience as a political prisoner. The film premiered at the 2009 Sundance Film Festival, where it won the Special Jury Prize for World Cinema. It opened in theatres on September 24, 2010 in New York City.

Synopsis
Tibet in Song tells the story of Ngawang Choephel, a Tibetan exile and former Fulbright scholar at Middlebury College, who returns to Tibet in 1995 to videotape traditional music and dance. The films follows his travels throughout the country recording music and understanding the impact of Chinese communist rule on Tibetan culture and everyday life. The movie contends that the Chinese authorities re-purposed traditional Tibetan music to forward their own agenda and propaganda.

Production
Two months into the trip, after he'd sent a batch of material back to friends in India, Chinese intelligence agents arrested Choephel and confiscated his camera, notes, and videotape. He was convicted of spying, without a trial, and sentenced to 18 years in prison. While in prison he continued his research, transcribing songs from prisoners and eventually memorizing songs after his notes were confiscated. His mother launched a tireless campaign for his freedom, and in January 2002, he was released.

Reception
The film received positive reviews from critics and the Tibetan community in exile. On January 24, 2009 the film was awarded the Special Jury Prize for World Cinema at the Sundance Film Festival and Ngawang Choephel became the first Tibetan to win an award at Sundance.

Accolades
 Cinema for Peace, International Human Rights Award, 2010
 Sundance Film Festival, World Cinema Special Jury Prize, 2009

See also 
List of TV and films critical of Chinese Communist Party

References

External links
 Official website

2009 films
2009 documentary films
Sundance Film Festival award winners
Documentary films about music and musicians
Tibetan music